The University of Kansas School of Engineering, founded in 1891 is the oldest Engineering School in the State of Kansas, although engineering degrees were awarded as early as 1873. It is an ABET accredited, public engineering school located on the main campus of the University of Kansas in Lawrence, Kansas.

In the U.S. News & World Report’s America’s Best Colleges, 2013 issue, KU’s School of Engineering was ranked 36th among public schools in the United States of America, making it the highest ranked engineering school in Kansas. National rankings for individual graduate programs included Aerospace Engineering at 30th and Computer Engineering at 40th.

Notable alumni
 Alan Mulally (BS/MS AE), President and CEO of Ford Motor Company
 Brian McClendon (BSEE 1986), VP of Engineering at Google.
 Robert J. Eaton (ME 1963), retired DaimlerChrysler AG Chairman.
 Rear Adm. Wayne E. Meyer (BSEE 1946) Director of the AEGIS Shipbuilding Project. 
 Lou Montulli, co-founder of Netscape and author of the Lynx web browser.
 Charles E. Spahr (1934), former CEO of Standard Oil of Ohio.
 Douglas Shane (BS 1982), director of flight operations for SpaceShipOne, which made the first privately funded human spaceflight.
 Linda Zarda Cook (PE 1981), executive director of Shell Gas & Power and a member of the Shell Executive Committee.
 Maj. Gen. Joe Engle (AE 1955), astronaut and NASA space shuttle commander.

See also
 Kansas State University College of Engineering

References

External links
 

University of Kansas
Engineering schools and colleges in the United States
Engineering universities and colleges in Kansas
Educational institutions established in 1891
1891 establishments in Kansas